The Honourable Henry Belasyse, or Bellasis, May 1604 to May 1647, was an English politician from Yorkshire who sat in the House of Commons of England  variously between 1625 and 1642.

A reluctant Royalist during the First English Civil War, his eldest son Thomas married the daughter of Oliver Cromwell. He predeceased his father in May 1647.

Biography
Belasyse was the son of Thomas Belasyse, 1st Viscount Fauconberg and his wife Barbara Cholmeley. He matriculated at Trinity College, Cambridge in 1615, and was admitted to Lincoln's Inn in 1619.

In 1625 Belasyse was elected Member of Parliament for Thirsk until 1626. In 1628 he was elected MP for Yorkshire and sat until 1629 when King Charles decided to rule without parliament. In April 1640, he was re-elected for Yorkshire in the Short Parliament, and was elected for Yorkshire again in November 1640 for the Long Parliament.  He supported the King and was disabled from sitting in parliament in 1642. 
 
Belasyse died at the age of 43, predeceasing his father.

Family
Belasyse married Grace Barton, daughter of Sir Thomas Barton. They had the following children:
Thomas, who inherited the title Viscount Fauconberg from his grandfather in 1652, was created Earl of Fauconberg, and was ambassador to the Princes of Italy.
Henry, predeceased his father.
Roland, who was made a Knight of the Bath.
John, who died young.
Grace, who married George Saunderson, 5th Viscount Castleton.
Frances, who married Sir Henry Jones of Oxford.
Arabella, who married Sir William Frankland, 1st Baronet of Thirkley.
Barbara, who married Sir Walter Strickland.

Notes

References

 
 
 
 

 
 

1604 births
1647 deaths
Heirs apparent who never acceded
Alumni of Trinity College, Cambridge
English MPs 1625
English MPs 1626
English MPs 1628–1629
English MPs 1640 (April)
English MPs 1640–1648